Hof is a Germanic word found in German, Dutch, Old Norse, and Old English among others, designating a "courtyard, farmyard, royal court, hall, yard or garden". Technical meanings include:
Heathen hof, a type of Old Norse temple 
Bauernhof, Maierhof, types of Family farm

Places
It is very a common element in German, Dutch and Scandinavian place names, such as Hofgeismar or Tempelhof. By itself it may refer to the following places:

Austria
Hof, Upper Austria, see Sankt Marienkirchen am Hausruck
Hof bei Salzburg, a municipality in the district of Salzburg-Umgebung in the state of Salzburg
Hof am Leithaberge, a town in the district of Bruck an der Leitha in the state of Lower Austria
Hof bei Straden, a former municipality in the district of Südoststeiermark in the state of Styria

Czech Republic
Hof in Mähren, the former Austrian and German name for the municipality of Dvorce in the Bruntál District in the Moravian-Silesian Region

Germany
Hof (district), a Landkreis (district) in Bavaria
Hof, Bavaria, a town in the Hof district of Bavaria
Hof (electoral district), an electoral district comprising the town of Hof and the districts of Hof and Wunsiedel
Hof, Rhineland-Palatinate, a village in the Westerwaldkreis in Rhineland-Palatinate

Iceland
Heathen hof, a type of Old Norse temple
Hof, Iceland, a small village in the municipality of Sveitarfélagið Hornafjörður

Netherlands
Hof van Delft, a former municipality west of Delft, South Holland
Hof van Holland, High Court of the provinces of Holland and Zeeland 1428–1811
Hof van Savoye, Palace of Margaret of Austria in Mechelen, Antwerp
Hof van Twente, a municipality in Twente, Overijssel

Norway
Hof, Åsnes, a village in Åsnes municipality in Innlandet county
Hof, Innlandet, a former municipality in the old Hedmark county
Hof, Vestfold, a former municipality in the old Vestfold county
 Hof Prison, a prison in Holmestrand municipality in Vestfold og Telemark county

People
Hof (surname), a Dutch and German surname

Buildings
Hof Ásatrúarfélagsins, temple in Reykjavík, Iceland
Hofburg, the imperial palace in Vienna

Acronym
 HOf gauge, 1:87 rail modelling using 6.5 mm track.
 Hall of fame
 High on Fire, an American band
 Higher-order function
 Horton overland flow
 House of Fraser, a British department store
 Huisman-Olff-Fresco models
 Hypofluorous acid
 RPC-TV, formerly HOF-TV, a Panamanian television network

See also 
 van 't Hof
 Siege of Hof (1553), during the Second Margrave War
 Battle of Hof (1809), during the Napoleonic Wars
 Hoff (disambiguation)
 Hofgarten (disambiguation)